Florida is the capital of Florida Department of Uruguay. Having a population of over 33,000, it is home to almost half of the inhabitants of the department.

Geography

The stream Arroyo Santa Lucía Chico flows along the east and south limits of the city. 

History
The city was founded on 24 April 1809 with this name, Florida, in honor of the count of Floridablanca, the prime minister of the Spanish crown. It had acquired the status of "Villa" (town) before the Independence of Uruguay. On 10 July 1856, it became capital city of the department by the Act of Ley Nº 493 and on 19 April 1894 its status was elevated to "Ciudad" (city) by the Act of Ley Nº 2.258.

It is home of the famous Piedra Alta de la Florida, the place of the Declaration of Independence in 1825. The city is also famous for San Cono's chapel, where multitudes gather every 3 June.

An important building is the Cathedral of Florida, which is the National Sanctuary of the Virgin of the Thirty-Three.

Population
In 2020, Florida had a population of 99,564.
 
Source: Instituto Nacional de Estadística de Uruguay

Economic activity and noted events

There are many factories in Florida. Florida is also host of the traditional Florida's Triathlon, one of the oldest triathlon events in the country.

Sister city
Florida has one sister city:

 Asunción, Paraguay

Places of worship
 Cathedral Sanctuary of Our Lady of the Thirty-Three (Roman Catholic)
 St. Joseph Parish Church (Roman Catholic)
 St. Thérèse of Lisieux Parish Church (Roman Catholic)
 St. Conus Chapel in Florida, a very popular Roman Catholic pilgrimage sanctuary

References

External links

INE map of Ciudad de Florida
Centro Comercial e Industrial de Florida

Populated places in the Florida Department
Populated places established in 1809